Lauren Tarshis is an author of children's books, with several series of fiction, non-fiction and historical fiction works found in thousands of libraries and translated into several languages.

She is the author of the  New York Times  Bestselling series I Survived. The books, fast-paced historical fiction for kids in grades 3–5, focus on historical disasters from the perspective of a boy or girl who lived to tell the tale.

She is also the author of Emma-Jean Lazarus Fell Out of a Tree, a Golden Kite honor book for fiction and Oprah book club pick, and the sequel Emma-Jean Lazarus Fell in Love. The books are on many state lists and are often used by schools as part of anti-bully programs.

In addition to writing books, Tarshis is SVP Editor-in-Chief & Publisher of the Classroom Magazine Division at Scholastic, Inc., which includes Storyworks magazine, a language arts magazine for children in grades 3-6 that she has edited for several years.

Bibliography

Emma-Jean Lazarus books

Emma-Jean Lazarus fell out of a tree (2007), in over 1,600 WorldCat libraries (reviewed by Bulletin of the Center for Children's Books)
Translated into French as Pourquoi Emma-Jane est tombée de l'arbre, et ce qui s'ensuivit... (2010)
Translated into German as Emma-Jean und das Geheimnis des Glücks (2009)
Translated into Japanese as エマ・ジーン・ラザルス、木から落ちる / Ema jīn razarusu ki kara ochiru (2008)
Emma-Jean Lazarus fell in love (2009), in over 1,000 WorldCat Libraries
Translated into German as Emma-Jean und das Geheimnis der Freundschaft (2011)

I Survived series
Lauren Tarshis has written 21 books for the I Survived series as of October 2020. They are historical fiction books about children who survive different disasters, including storms, wars, battles, and wild animal attacks. The tagline for the series is "When Disaster Strikes, Heroes Are Made." The books are published by Scholastic Inc.

The first book in the series was published in 2010 and is called I Survived the Sinking of the Titanic, 1912.

The latest book in the series was published in 2021 and is called I Survived The Galveston Hurricane of 1900.

In 2018, the first of six I Survived books in Spanish were released for the U.S. market: Sobreviví los Ataques de Tiburones de 1916
(I Survived the Shark Attacks of 1916). In 2019, two more titles were released: "Sobreviví el Naufragio del Titanic, 1912 (I Survived the Sinking of the Titanic, 1912), and Sobreviví el Terremoto de San Francisco, 1906 (I Survived the San Francisco Earthquake, 1906).  In 2020, a fourth title was released: Sobreviví el huracán Katrina, 2005 (I Survived Hurricane Katrina, 2005). Two more Spanish language I Survived titles released in 2021, Sobreviví el Bomdardeo de Pearl Harbor, 1941 (I Survived The Bombing Of Pearl Harbor, 1941) and Sobreviví los ataques del 11 de septiembre de 2001 (I Survived The Attacks Of September 11, 2001). 

Tarshis has also written 3 non-fiction books for the I Survived True Stories spin-off series, featuring some of the real events that the I Survived historical fiction books are based on.  "I Survived True Stories #1: Five Epic Disasters." was released in 2014 and was followed in 2015 by "I Survived True Stories #2 Nature Attacks!," and by "I Survived True Stories #3 Tornado Terror," in 2017.  

In 2020, two new graphic novels were released: I Survived The Sinking of the Titanic, 1912 Graphic Novel and I Survived The Shark Attacks of 1916 Graphic Novel.

I Survived has been translated into ten languages including Chinese, Czech, French, Japanese, Korean, Romanian, Russian, Spanish, Swedish, and Vietnamese.

Other works
The making of Ironweed (1988), also written by Claudio Edinger and William Kennedy

References

External links
Lauren's Author Site
Scholastic's I Survived site

American children's writers
Living people
Writers from Albuquerque, New Mexico
American women children's writers
1963 births
21st-century American women writers